Bench crater is a small crater in Mare Cognitum on the Moon.  The name of the crater was formally adopted by the IAU in 1973.  

The Apollo 12 astronauts Pete Conrad and Alan Bean landed the Lunar Module (LM) Intrepid northeast of Bench crater on November 24, 1969.  To the northeast of Bench are the larger Head and Surveyor craters.  To the west is Sharp crater (now called Sharp-Apollo). 

The crater is called Bench because of perceived terraces (benches) within the crater.  A wide area on the west side of the crater was referred to as "low bench" and a smaller area on the east side was referred to as "high bench" during mission planning.

Samples

References

Impact craters on the Moon
Apollo 12